Banco do Brasil S.A. is a Brazilian financial services company headquartered in Brasília, Brazil. The oldest bank in Brazil, and among the oldest banks in continuous operation in the world, it was founded by John VI, King of Portugal, on Wednesday, 12 October 1808. It is the second largest banking institution in Brazil, as well as the second largest in Latin America, and the seventieth largest bank in the world. Banco do Brasil is controlled by the Brazilian government and is listed at the B3 stock exchange in São Paulo.

It has been one of the four most profitable Brazilian banks since 2000 (along with Itaú Unibanco, Banco Bradesco and Banco Santander) and holds a strong leadership position in retail banking.

History

Banco do Brasil was founded in 1808 by then prince regent John (later King John VI of Portugal) to finance the kingdom's public debt when he moved from Europe to Brazil. "As a mixed institution under state control, the Banco do Brasil served as a commercial bank, the government's fiscal agent, and Brazil's first bank of issue." It went bankrupt two times in history: once during independence in 1821, when John VI returned to Portugal taking with him some of the bank's assets, and a second time in 1898.

From 1821 to 1964 Banco do Brasil occasionally performed tasks that exceeded its role as a traditional commercial bank: issuing currency, having the monopoly of currency exchange transactions and serving as National Treasury holder for the government. Such tasks were gradually given to other governmental institutions, mainly with the creation of the Central Bank of Brazil in 1964 and the separation from the National Treasury in 1987.

From 1992 onwards it was restructured as a commercial bank, using its huge geographic distribution and credit assets to leverage its redesign as a "normal" bank. In the process, tens of thousands of workers were laid off.

After decades of losses due to being used to finance some of the Brazilian Federal Government public policies, the bank became very profitable across the years. The bank is one of the key structures used by Brazilian government to restabilize the market (like preventing cartelizations in the bank interest market or  stabilizing the bank credit during financial distress times like the 2008-2009 global crisis). The institution  also is used to finance public programs such as the DRS - Sustainable Regional Development initiatives.

In November 2013, The Banker ranked Banco de Brasil as the top bank in Brazil based on Tier 1 capital.

Branding
The current logo has been in use since the 1960s, when the standard colors changed from brown and yellow to blue-grey-and yellow.

Since the early 1980s, the bank has sponsored several sports competitions (in sports such as beach soccer, volleyball, tennis, table tennis, futsal, sailing, motorsport and beach volleyball). It is the official sponsor for Robert Scheidt, Gustavo Kuerten, Enzo Fittipaldi, Pietro Fittipaldi, and the Brazilian national beach soccer, volleyball, and futsal teams.

The bank also sponsors other cultural events such as plays through its organization CCBB (Centro Cultural Banco do Brasil) and amateur sports through the AABB (Associação Atlética Banco do Brasil).

Supermodel Gisele Bündchen was chosen to be the face of their first global ad campaign in 2012.

Services
In addition to commercial and government services, the bank offers a large variety of services to the consumer including bill payment services (Boleto), ATM loans, and a single package that contains the account numbers for checking, multiple savings accounts, and investment account. The account holder may apply for international MasterCard and Visa debit cards which act as both a credit card on a loan account, and as a debit card on the checking account (a little different from the arrangement in many other countries, where both the debit and credit functions of a debit card act on the checking account). The list of services offered encompass many complex automatic functions from ATMs and online such as a wide variety of loans, automatic payments, Brazilian bill payments, and deposits to other Brazilian accounts. Many merchants routinely accept account-to-account transfers as payment for goods.

International users
Banco do Brasil has a few branches in the United States (Washington, Miami) and other countries. These branches are intended for use by large companies and for permanent residents of Brasil who visit the other countries, but they also offer regular services for residents of the countries where they are located.

Banco do Brasil has been expanding its international presence and currently has more than 44 points of service abroad, divided into branches, sub-branches, business units / offices and subsidiaries.

Offices and subsidiaries

  Asuncion
  Buenos Aires
  Caracas
  Ciudad del Este
  Dubai
  George Town
  Hong Kong
  La Paz
  Lima
  Lisbon
  London
  Luanda
  Madrid
  Mexico City
  Miami
  Montevideo
  Paris
  Panama City
  Rome
  Santiago
  Singapore
  Seoul
  Shanghai
  Tokyo
  Vienna
  Washington

Interest rates
Interest rates on loans vary to a great extent but, being a public-owned bank that operates as a commercial venture, Banco do Brasil is not noted for having the highest, or the lowest rates either.

Relationship with the government
Traditionally the CEO is appointed by the Brazilian president but usually picked from a list of career directors. A few CEOs were taken from outside the financial industry.

Banco do Brasil has the monopoly of a number of government funding programs, like Pronaf (National Subsistence Farming Support), DRS, Fome Zero (zero hunger), PASEP, and others, and is the bank of choice for most municipal and state governments.

Hiring process

Being public-owned, Banco do Brasil must recruit workers through a public draft process, known as Concurso Público and work within strict norms of business. Due to the security which the public draft process provides working for Banco do Brasil is considered a desirable job in most of Brazil. This process is usually carried out separately for each region, with approved candidates being recruited to any branch in the region, in which they completed the process, within the following two years in order of classification (it can be delayed for more than two years, once in each process). Candidates must be Brazilian nationals (or legal residents and naturalised) and must be able to prove that they have completed their military service and electoral registration obligations (military service is mandatory for men and voter registration is mandatory for all Brazilians aged 18 to 70).

Banco do Brasil also has 49 offices/places of business in 23 different countries, and according to the local laws of every country the employees may be local hires. The Miami Branch plus the North America Regional Office (BBUSA) and its subsidiaries in the USA (Eurobank FL - Banco do Brasil Americas, and BB Money Transfers) also have local hires.

In order for a local to be hired by the bank, the candidate must pass a competitive test, as well as demonstrate the ability to communicate in multiple languages, knowledge of finance, economics, computer sciences, business administration and asset management, trade, structured and project finance, among others, related to the positions that open and become available as the bank expands. Having prior experience working in related areas is fundamental.

Other public-owned Brazilian banks, like Caixa Econômica Federal, Banco da Amazônia, and Banco do Nordeste also carry out a similar process but the process carried out by Banco do Brasil is the archetypal Brazilian Concurso Público like that of all Brazilian government funded public service jobs.

Sponsorships

Banco do Brasil is an official sponsor of the Brazil national volleyball team and had a long-running association with Brazilian racing driver Felipe Nasr and were the title sponsor of his team, Sauber. 
Currently, Banco do Brasil sponsors the brothers Enzo Fittipaldi, Formula 2 driver for Charouz, and Pietro Fittipaldi, Haas F1 Team reserve driver

References

External links
 
 Banco do Brasil website 
 Banco do Brasil RI 
 Banco do Brasil information 
 BB Americas 

Banks of Brazil
Brazilian brands
Companies based in Brasília
Companies listed on B3 (stock exchange)
Banks established in 1808
Government-owned companies of Brazil